Rafael Cooper (born January 8, 1975) is a former American football running back who played with the Detroit Lions of the NFL, Memphis Maniax of the XFL, and the Amsterdam Admirals of NFL Europe. He played college football at Minnesota and Louisville.

References 

Living people
1975 births
American football running backs
Amsterdam Admirals players
Detroit Lions players
Louisville Cardinals football players
Memphis Maniax players
Minnesota Golden Gophers football players
Players of American football from Detroit